Major general is a military rank used in many countries. It is derived from the older rank of sergeant major general. The disappearance of the "sergeant" in the title explains the apparent confusion of a lieutenant general outranking a major general, whereas a major outranks a lieutenant.

In the English speaking countries, when appointed to a field command, a major general is typically in command of a division consisting of around 6,000 to 25,000 troops (several regiments or brigades). It is a rank that is subordinate to the rank of lieutenant general and senior to the rank of brigadier or brigadier general. In the Commonwealth, major general is equivalent to the navy rank of rear admiral. In air forces with a separate rank structure  (Commonwealth), major general is equivalent to air vice-marshal. 

In some countries including much of Eastern Europe, major general is the lowest of the general officer ranks, with no brigadier general rank. These countries may be used as the rank of brigade commanders.

Countries

Major general ranks by country

Australia

Brunei

In the sultanate of Brunei, the rank of Major general is used by the Royal Brunei Land Forces and the Royal Brunei Air Force. The rank is held by the Commander of the Royal Brunei Armed Forces.

Canada

In the Canadian Armed Forces, the rank of major-general (MGen) is both a Canadian Army and Royal Canadian Air Force rank equivalent to the Royal Canadian Navy's rank of rear-admiral.  A major-general is a general officer, the equivalent of a naval flag officer.  The major-general rank is senior to the ranks of brigadier-general and commodore, and junior to lieutenant-general and vice-admiral.  Prior to 1968, the Air Force used the rank of air vice-marshal, instead.

The rank insignia for a major-general in the Royal Canadian Air Force is a wide braid under a single narrow braid on the cuff, as well as two silver maple leaves beneath crossed sword and baton, all surmounted by St. Edward's Crown.  In the Canadian Army, the rank insignia is a wide braid on the cuff, as well as two gold maple leaves beneath crossed sword and baton, all surmounted by St. Edward's Crown.  It is worn on the shoulder straps of the service dress tunic, and on slip-ons on other uniforms.  On the visor of the service cap are two rows of gold oak leaves.

Major-generals are initially addressed as 'general' and name, as are all general officers; thereafter by subordinates as 'sir' or 'ma'am' as applicable in English.  Major-generals are normally entitled to staff cars.

India

New Zealand
In the New Zealand Army, major-general is the rank held by the chief of army (formerly the chief of general staff).  The more senior rank of lieutenant-general is reserved for when an army officer holds the position of chief of defence force, who commands all New Zealand's armed forces.  This position is subject to rotation between the heads of the New Zealand Air Force, New Zealand Army, and New Zealand Navy.

Pakistan
Major general in the Pakistan Army is equivalent to rear admiral in the Pakistan Navy and air vice marshal in the Pakistan Air Force.  It is the lowest of the general officer ranks, ranking between brigadier and lieutenant general.

Portugal
The rank of major-general was reintroduced in the Portuguese Army, Portuguese Air Force, and Portuguese National Republican Guard in 1999, replacing the former rank of brigadier in the role of brigade commander.  As a rank, it had previously been used in the Army only for a brief period (from 1862 to 1864).  It is equivalent to the rank of contra-almirante (rear-admiral) in the Portuguese Navy.  In 2015, the rank of major-general was moved up one level, with the role of brigade commander being assumed by the below rank of brigadier-general.

In most of the 19th and first half of the 20th century, major-general was not used as a rank in the Portuguese military, but as an appointment title conferred to the general officer that acted as the military head of a service branch.  The roles of Major-General of the Navy (Major-General da Armada) and Major-General of the Army (Major-General do Exército) became extinct in 1950, with their roles being unified in the then created Chief of the General Staff of the Armed Forces.

Russia
It is equivalent to a British brigadier or an American brigadier general.

Sri Lanka

Turkey

Thus, linguistically, it is similar to the French equivalent for a major general, .

United Kingdom

United States

In the United States, the rank of major general exists in the United States Air Force, United States Army, United States Marine Corps, and United States Space Force.

Generalmajor

Generalmajor is the Germanic variant of major general, used in a number of Central and Northern European countries, including Austria, Belgium, Denmark, Finland, Germany, Norway, and Sweden.

Insignia

Army

See also
 Comparative military ranks
 Military unit
 Major General's Song

References

Citations

Sources 

 Boatner, Mark M., III. The Civil War Dictionary. New York: David McKay, 1959. .
 Bowden, Scotty & Tarbox, Charlie. Armies on the Danube 1809. Arlington, TX: Empire Games Press, 1980. .
 Foote, Shelby. The Civil War: A Narrative. Vol. 2. New York: Random House, 1986. .

External links 
 

Military ranks of Canada
Military insignia
Military ranks
Military ranks of Australia
Military ranks of Singapore
Pakistan Army ranks
Military ranks of British India